Kalinčiakovo is a village in the Levice District of western Slovakia, now administratively a part of the town of Levice. It is best known for a well-preserved 12th-century Romanesque church, currently belonging to a Reformed congregation.

Notable people from Kalinčiakovo include the economist Imrich Karvaš (1903-1981), governor of the National Bank of the Slovak Republic (1939–1945) from 1939 until arrested by the Gestapo in 1944.

See also
 Romanesque church in Kalinčiakovo

External links
 History of Kalinčiakovo on Levice tourism website (in Slovak)

Villages in Slovakia
Levice District